*Special pageant for Miss Universe & World 2001
 **The Miss Dominican Republic 2000 in July 1999 was revoked as an edition to be able to remake the pageant in March 2000.

External links 
Official Miss Dominican Republic website

Editions
Miss Dominican Republic editions